Troubridge Point is a headland in the Australian state of  South Australia located on the south coast of Yorke Peninsula about  south west of Edithburgh.  It is the western end of the opening to Gulf St Vincent.

Description
It is the most easterly point of the Yorke Peninsula coast that directly adjoins Investigator Strait. It is the termination for a pair of coastlines - one extending from Cape Spencer in the west and the other extending from Sultana Point from the north in Gulf St Vincent. It is the western end of the opening to Gulf St Vincent. As of 2014, the point was located within the locality of Honiton.

Formation, geology & oceanography 
Troubridge Point was formed when the sea reached its present level 7,500 years ago after sea levels started to rise at the start of the Holocene.
The cliff line which includes Troubridge Point consists of a sedimentary rock called Port Willinga Formation.  

Economic activity
As of 2014, the land adjoining Troubridge Point is used for farming.

See also
Troubridge Hill
Troubridge Hill Lighthouse

References

Headlands of South Australia
Yorke Peninsula
Gulf St Vincent
Investigator Strait